The 1999–2000 Terceira Divisão season was the 50th season of the competition and the 10th season of recognised fourth-tier football in Portugal.

Overview
The league was contested by 118 teams in 7 divisions of 10 to 18 teams.

Terceira Divisão – Série A

Terceira Divisão – Série B

Terceira Divisão – Série C

Terceira Divisão – Série D

Terceira Divisão – Série E

Terceira Divisão – Série F

Terceira Divisão – Série Açores
Série Açores – Preliminary League Table

Série Açores – Promotion Group

Terceira Divisão - Série Açores Relegation Group

Footnotes

External links
 Portuguese Division Three – footballzz.co.uk

Portuguese Third Division seasons
Port
4